Northern Greece is used to refer to the northern parts of Greece, and can have various definitions.
Administrative regions of Greece

Administrative term 
The term "Northern Greece" is widely used to refer mainly to the two northern regions of Macedonia and (Western) Thrace; thus the Thessaloniki-based Ministry of Macedonia and Thrace was known as "Ministry for Northern Greece" (Υπουργείο Βορείου Ελλάδος), and previously as the Governorate-General of Northern Greece (Γενική Διοίκηση Βορείου Ελλάδος), until 1988.

Broader term and NUTS usage 
The term Lower Greece was mentioned in 16th century western correspondence when the region was under Ottoman rule, it included Northern Epirus and Western Macedonia. 

The term Northern Greece may also, according to context, incorporate the region Epirus. When Epirus is included, it is broadly coterminous with the "New Lands" (Νέες Χώρες), i.e. the territories added to the Kingdom of Greece after the Balkan Wars of 1912–13, as opposed to pre-1912 "Old Greece" (Παλαιά Ελλάδα). This distinction survives in the ecclesiastical domain, where the dioceses of the "New Lands" de jure still adhere to the Patriarchate of Constantinople, but are de facto under the Church of Greece.

Voreia Ellada is also one of the four Greek NUTS regions, created for statistical purposes by the European Union. Until 2014, it encompassed the four administrative regions Eastern Macedonia and Thrace, Central Macedonia, West Macedonia and Thessaly. Coming into effect in January 2015, the Greek NUTS regions were redefined, with Voreia Ellada now encompassing Epirus instead of Thessaly. This NUTS division is not used by Greece for any administrative purposes.

Linguistics 
In linguistics, Northern Greece refers to the areas where the Northern Greek dialect is traditionally spoken, encompassing in addition to the previous regions Central Greece except for Attica, and the North Aegean, except Chios.

Maps

Northern Greece statistics 
According to 2011 Eurostat data, Voreia Ellada, as defined until 2014, had a total population of 3,590,187 inhabitants.

References 

 
NUTS 1 statistical regions of Greece